Briggs High School may refer to:

Richard C. Briggs High School - Norwalk, Connecticut
Briggs High School (Columbus, Ohio) - Columbus, Ohio